William Tibbs (September 29, 1931 – September 18, 2009) was a professional ice hockey goaltender.

Playing career

He played most of his career in the minor leagues including stops with the Hershey Bears  of the AHL, Troy Bruins of the IHL and the Omaha Knights of the USHL. He served as the backup goaltender to Terry Sawchuk during the 1952 post-season and as such got his name engraved on the Stanley Cup that season.  However, Tibbs never played a single game in NHL.

Bill Tibbs, playing for the Troy Bruins won the IHL's James Norris Memorial Trophy for the fewest goals against during the 1955–1956 regular season.

Trivia
Height 5' 10"
Weight 175 lbs

References

 Picture of Bill Tibbs' Name on the 1952 Stanley Cup Plaque
 

1931 births
2009 deaths
Hershey Bears players
Omaha Knights (USHL) players
Ice hockey people from Winnipeg